Sadia Azmat (born 1990) is an English stand-up comedian of Indian descent.

Early life
Azmat was born in Leyton, England. At the age of 19, she started wearing hijab.

Career
Azmat had been working in call-centres of varying descriptions, but in 2010, Azmat started performing stand-up comedy.

In August 2011, she performed her debut show Please Hold – You're Being Transferred to a UK Based Asian Representative at the Edinburgh Fringe Festival at the Laughing Horse @ Finnegan's Wake, which was directed by Deborah Frances-White. In August 2011, Azmat also featured on BBC Radio 4's Front Row and a producer invited her to perform at the Cape Town Festival 2012.

In December 2011, she performed at the Desi Central Comedy Tour in Glasgow.

In August 2014, she performed her debut full-length show I'm not Malala at the Edinburgh Fringe Festival at the Laughing Horse. In September 2014, she was interviewed by Nadia Hussein and Sakinah Lenoir on British Muslim TV's Sisters' Hour.

In June 2015, she made a short film Things I Have Been Asked As a British Muslim as part of the British Muslim Comedy series, five short films by Muslim comedians commissioned by the BBC for release on BBC iPlayer. Azmat debunked Muslim stereotypes, including the "Muslim verdict", racism, Ramadan, integration and hijab, thus providing a look at life as a Muslim woman. In August 2015, she performed at the inaugural Muslim Lifestyle Expo at the Ricoh Arena in Coventry. In September 2015, she appeared on Sky News's Morning Stories series on YouTube, questioning what people would be willing to do for someone we love.

In January 2016, Azmat appeared on This Week where she criticised David Cameron's push for English language lessons for Muslim women to help them resist the lure of Islamic extremism.

In March 2017, as part of our All Women Everywhere month, Azmat appeared on a video about Asian Women talking about stereotypes they deal with while dating.

Azmat also a regular in the YouTube channel Bend It TV aimed to providing the news from an Asian perspective.

Comedy style
Azmat's act is observational humour about her experiences working as a call centre operative for a well-known car insurance firm, being a British Asian Muslim growing up in London, and moves on to more general cross-cultural issues, about race and religion, her difficulties in the UK job market and an Asian mum gag.

Azmat is described by The Sunday Times as "hilarious and insightful" for her current set of I Am Not Malala.

Awards and recognition
In September 2011, Azmat was shortlisted for the Funny Women Awards final in Leicester Square Theatre, London.

See also
Islamic humour
British Pakistani
List of British Pakistanis

References

External links

Rampen, Julia. ‘Please Hold, You're Being Transferred to a UK Based Asian Representative’, Sadia Azmat. New Kid. 4 August 2011

1987 births
Living people
Date of birth missing (living people)
English Muslims
English people of Pakistani descent
English women comedians
English stand-up comedians
English comedy writers
Muslim female comedians
British comedians of Pakistani descent
People from Essex